The Iiyama Vision Master Pro computer monitor line was manufactured by Iiyama, a high-end manufacturer of LCD and CRT monitors, as advanced version of Vision Master line.

Overview 
This CRT monitor was manufactured in the 1990s, and has been discontinued. For a year from April 1997 to April 1998, this monitor was at the top of PCWorlds chart as a Best Buy. According to PC Pro magazine, it dominated the UK monitor market at around that period.

This line was succeed by Iiyama Vision Master ProLite LCD monitor series, later rebranded as simply ProLite.

Models

Vision Master Pro 17 
The Iiyama Vision Master Pro 17 computer monitor was released by Iiyama in 1997.

Technical specifications
Screen - The monitor was a CRT with a phosphor area diagonal: , dot pitch of 0.26mm. The screen had a short persistence phosphor with an anti-reflection and anti-static coating. The horizontal sync frequency was 27.086.0kHz, and the vertical sync frequency was 50160Hz. In 2000 this model received a tube upgrade: a Mitsubishi Diamondtron FD tube with 0.24mm dot pitch was equipped.

Video connectors - The two standard input connections are 5-BNC and D-sub mini 15 pin.

Power - The monitor operated on a standard 120V 60Hz line or 230V 50Hz, consuming a maximum of 110W of power. Standby power was 10W maximum, and suspend mode was 6W maximum.

Pro 400

Pro 454

Pro 510 
Released in 1999

References

External links
 Iiyama website

Iiyama monitors